The Danish Astronautical Society was inaugurated on 20 September 1949, and its prime focus is spreading knowledge and information about spaceflight and space science. The Danish Astronautical Society participated in founding the International Astronautical Federation in 1951 and serves as the Danish section of the IAF.

Goals and activities of the Danish Astronautical Society 

The Danish Astronautical Society engages in efforts to communicate with the public of Denmark. For example, they arrange company visits to Danish aerospace companies and space institutions. The society also arranges public lectures on space-related material, has meetings, and shows exhibitions on spaceflight. As a section of the International Astronautical Federation, the goals of the Danish Astronautical Society are to promote the peaceful usage of space and to promote public knowledge regarding space (as well as scientific literacy).

List of current and former honorary members of the DAS 

Helle Stub
Henrik Stub
Christian F. Rovsing
Bjørn Franck Jørgensen
Yvonne Darlene Cagle 
Thomas Reiter
Preben Gudmandsen 
Georgi Grechko 
Jens Martin Knudsen 
Morten E. Olsen
Erik O. Errebo-Knudsen
Erling Buch Andersen
Asger Lundbak
Gunnar Helstrøm
Hermann Oberth
Leo Hansen

References

Organizations established in 1949
Space organizations
Scientific societies based in Denmark